Vincent Jansz. van der Vinne (1736, Haarlem – 1811, Haarlem), was a Dutch 18th century painter and the great-grandson of Vincent van der Vinne.

Biography
According to the RKD he was a pupil of his father Jan Laurentsz van der Vinne, who made botanical paintings of flowers for bulb growers in Haarlem. He became a member of the Haarlem Guild of St. Luke in 1754. He is known for Italianate landscapes and flower still lifes, and also created tapestries. He was the first curator of art for the young Teyler's Museum during the years 1778-1785. In his Will Pieter Teyler van der Hulst had stipulated that ‘an artistic painter or other lover of the arts and sciences' would live in his house (later called Fundatiehuis). His task would be to maintain the books in the library and other collections (the medals, prints and drawings); and to catalogue and conserve them. This person would also be the manager or ‘resident caretaker' of the house, and, later, of the museum. Vincent van der Vinne was the first 'resident caretaker' of Teylers Museum and set up his studio in the fundatiehuis.  
He left after an argument with Martin van Marum, whereupon his position was filled by Wybrand Hendriks.

Works
He is known for decorations for whole rooms, though little has survived of the work he did for Teylers Stichting. On the Gedempte Oude Gracht, Haarlem, a series of wall decorations symbolizing the four seasons remain as they were installed in 1776 in house number 90-92 (today a furniture store, open to the public).

References

External sources 
Biography of van der Vinne on Teylers Museum website.
Vincent Jansz. van der Vinne on Artnet.

1736 births
1811 deaths
18th-century Dutch painters
18th-century Dutch male artists
Dutch male painters
Artists from Haarlem
Teylers Museum